Carl Wieland (born 1950) is an Australian young earth creationist, author and speaker. He was the Managing Director of Creation Ministries International (formerly  Answers in Genesis - Australia), a Creationist apologetics ministry. CMI are the distributors of Creation magazine and the Journal of Creation.

Biography
Wieland is a medical doctor who graduated from Adelaide University in South Australia but he stopped practising medicine in 1986. This was due to an accident Wieland was in with "a fully laden fuel tanker at highway speeds." He endured five and a half months in hospital and has undergone more than fifty operations, as discussed in his book, Walking Through Shadows. He is a past president of the Christian Medical Fellowship of South Australia.

Wieland has said that during his time at university he was an atheist. In 1976 Wieland formed the Creation Science Association (CSA), a South Australian creationist organisation modelled after the Creation Research Society. In 1978 this organisation began publishing a magazine, Ex Nihilo (later called Creation Ex Nihilo), "to explain and promote special creation as a valid scientific explanation of origins." In 1980, CSA merged with a Queensland group to form the Creation Science Foundation, which subsequently became Answers in Genesis (AiG).

In 2005 AiG split as a result of long-standing disagreements between Carl Wieland, CEO of AiG-Australia and Ken Ham, CEO of AiG-US. Ham retained leadership of the AiG's United States and United Kingdom branches under the AiG name, while Wieland retained the Australian branch and affiliation with the Canadian, New Zealand and South African branches, under the name Creation Ministries International, and established CMI offices both the United States and the United Kingdom.

On 6 March 2015, Wieland retired from active creation ministry, and stepped down as CEO of CMI-Australia.

Publications

References

Sources

External links
Creation Ministries International biography

1950 births
Living people
Christian apologists
Christian writers
Christian Young Earth creationists
Leaders of Christian parachurch organizations
University of Adelaide alumni